I'm Over You may refer to:

"I'm Over You" (Martine McCutcheon song), 2000
"I'm Over You" (Sequal song), 1988
"I'm Over You" (Keith Whitley song), 1990
"I'm Over You", a Stan Rogers song, 1994

See also
 Over You (disambiguation)